The AWF Hardcore Championship is a professional wrestling championship currently inactive in the South African professional wrestling promotion Africa Wrestling Alliance, contested under hardcore rules. It was created on 11 December 2004 on the AWA's final two-hour live television special, AWF on E Slam Series Final, when Skull defeated Jacques Rogue. The title was retired in early 2005 when AWA failed to secure another year of television with e.tv and returned to its roots as a regionally based promotion.

Title history

References

External links
Official African Wrestling Alliance Website

Africa Wrestling Alliance championships
Hardcore wrestling championships